Embassy is a 1972 British spy thriller film directed by Gordon Hessler, written by John Bird and William Fairchild, and with music scored by Biddu. It is based on the 1969 novel of the same title by Stephen Coulter. It was shot on location in Beirut where the film is set, whereas the novel had been centred in Paris.

The film starred Richard Roundtree as a CIA officer, Ray Milland as an Ambassador, Max von Sydow as a Russian defector taking refuge at the embassy, and Chuck Connors as a KGB assassin posing as a U.S. Air Force officer. Broderick Crawford played the embassy Regional Security Officer, Frank Dunniger, who had to capture and hide the KGB man while the CIA smuggled the defector out of town.

Cast
 Richard Roundtree as Richard 'Dick' Shannon 
 Chuck Connors as Kesten 
 Marie-José Nat as Laure 
 Ray Milland as Ambassador 
 Broderick Crawford as Frank Dunniger 
 Max von Sydow as Gorenko 
 David Bauer as Kadish 
 Larry Cross as Gamble 
 David Healy as Phelan 
 Karl Held as Rylands 
 Sarah Marshall as Miss Harding 
 Dee Pollock as Stacey 
 Leila Buheiry as Leila, Receptionist 
 Gail Clymer as Switchboard Operator 
 Edmond Hannania as First Man in Black 
 Saladin Nader as Roget 
 Peter Smith as Cypher Clerk 
 Dean Turner as Clem Gelber

References

Bibliography
  James McKay. Ray Milland: The Films, 1929-1984. McFarland, 2020.

External links

http://filmsdefrance.com/FDF_Embassy_1972_rev.html
http://www.bcult.it/scheda.asp?Id=12831

1972 films
1970s spy thriller films
British spy thriller films
Films scored by Biddu
Films directed by Gordon Hessler
Films based on British novels
Cold War spy films
Films shot in Lebanon
Films set in Lebanon
1972 drama films
1970s English-language films
1970s British films